The 1914 Oregon Agricultural Aggies football team represented Oregon Agricultural College (now known as Oregon State University) during the 1914 college football season. In their second season under head coach E. J. Stewart, the Aggies compiled a 7–0–2 record and outscored their opponents by a combined total of 172 to 15. Against major opponents, the Aggies defeated Washington State (7–0), Idaho (26–0), and USC (38–6), and played to a tie against Washington (0–0) and Oregon (3–3).  The team played its home games at Bell Field in Corvallis, Oregon. James Shaw was the team captain.

Schedule

References

Oregon Agricultural
Oregon State Beavers football seasons
College football undefeated seasons
Oregon Agricultural Aggies football